Craigellachie may refer to:

 Craigellachie, British Columbia, Canada
 Craigellachie, Moray, Scotland
 Craigellachie railway station
Craigellachie distillery
 Craigellachie, Windsor, a heritage-listed house in Windsor, Brisbane, Queensland, Australia
 Craigellachie National Nature Reserve, a national nature reserve near Aviemore, Scotland